Miguel Navarro Cañizares (c. 1835 – 23 October 1913) was a Spanish painter and art teacher who worked in Venezuela and Brazil.

Biography 
He was born to a basket maker in Valencia and attended the Academy of Fine Arts. Later, he moved to Madrid, where he took classes at the San Fernando Academy and found a position in the workshop of Federico de Madrazo. In 1861, he entered a competition to fill a teaching vacancy at the "Escuela superior de Pintura, Escultura y Grabado", but was not successful. 
 
For several years, he participated in the National Exhibition of Fine Arts, where his painting of Saint Catherine being transported by angels won a gold medal. His canvas depicting Agustina de Aragón was distributed as a lithograph and used to illustrate a novel. In 1864, he won a grant to study in Rome for his version of the Raising of Jairus' daughter.
 
Later, in 1871, the Archbishop of Caracas, who was attending the First Vatican Council, saw some of Navarro's paintings and invited him to execute murals in the Caracas Cathedral; a project that would never be realized.

The editor of La Opinión Nacional, a pro-government daily, suggested that the newly arrived (and politically neutral) Navarro would be the perfect choice to immortalize the event. The huge painting hung in the Senate chambers at the Palacio Federal Legislativo until 1889, when it disappeared; probably destroyed by opponents of the former President who vandalized statues and portraits of him throughout the country.

His career in Brazil
In 1876, Archbishop Guevara was removed from office and went into exile. Bereft of patronage (and possibly no longer welcome), Navarro resigned his teaching position at the Academy of Fine Arts and departed for Rio de Janeiro with his wife and children. However, an epidemic of yellow fever there made him stop in Salvador. Soon, he found a position teaching at the "Escola de Artes e Ofícios da Bahia", but was dismissed a year later due to serious disagreements with the school's Director, José Antonio da Cunha Couto (1832-1894). As a result, Navarro and some friends decided to create a separate art academy.

Although the school was successful, Navarro could not maintain a sufficient income from the limited local demand for art so, after five years, he relocated to Rio de Janeiro, where he worked primarily as a portrait painter. His patrons there included the Royal family. He remained there until his death. A street in the Pituba district of Salvador is named after him.

References

Further reading 
 José Roberto Teixeira Leite, Pintores espanhóis no Brasil (Spanish painters in Brazil), Espaço Cultural Sérgio Barcellos, 1996.

External links

History of the Escola de Belas Artes from the EBA website.

1830s births
1913 deaths
History painters
Orientalist painters
People from Valencia
Real Academia de Bellas Artes de San Fernando alumni
Spanish emigrants to Brazil
Portrait painters
19th-century Spanish painters
19th-century Spanish male artists
Spanish male painters
20th-century Spanish painters
20th-century Spanish male artists